Milk Money is an American 4-piece hardrock/post-hardcore band from Salt Lake City, Utah.

The band formed in January 2019 and features members of mainstay Salt Lake City hardcore bands Cherem, City to City, and Tamerlane, among others. The band consists of guitarist/vocalist Dan Fletcher, guitarist Trevor Hale, bassist Byron Colindres, and drummer Drew Davenport.

Their debut album, Reckon, was recorded in August 2019 at Archive Recordings in Salt Lake City with producer Wes Johnson and mastered by Tyler Steadman. It was officially released independently on December 6, 2019.

Their second release, Howl, was released October 23, 2020. The album was recorded remotely due to the COVID-19 lockdown. The band tracked everything in home studios. It was then mixed and mastered by producer Scott Sellers.

Members

Current 

 Dan Fletcher - lead guitar, lead vocals
 Trevor Hale - rhythm guitar
 Byron Colindres - bass guitar, backing vocals
 Drew Davenport - drums, percussion

Discography

Studio albums 

 Reckon (Independent, 2019)

EPs 

 Howl (Independent, 2020)
 Iron Will (Independent, 2021)

Singles 

 Mad River - Demo (Independent, 2019)
 Black Rose (Independent, 2021)

References

External links 

 Official Website
 Reckon on Spotify

Musical groups from Salt Lake City
American post-hardcore musical groups
2019 establishments in Utah